Vice Admiral Refiloe Mudimu  is a former South African military commander, who served as the Chief of the Navy before his retirement in 2014.

Early life
Johannes Mudimu was born on 6 March 1954, in Sophiatown. He became a member of the African National Congress and Umkhonto We Sizwe (MK) in 1975.

Early career
Mudimu received his military training in Angola, East Germany and the then USSR. He successfully completed the commander's course in 1977. He then served as an instructor in MK camps until 1979 when he was deployed as Chief of Logistics in Luanda, Angola.

Mudimu later served in ANC Headquarters in Lusaka, Zambia as the co-ordinator of the ANC Youth Radio Programs as well as a member of the editorial board of the Youth Publications. Early in 1985, he was deployed in Harare, Zimbabwe as the ordnance operative.

Later, Mudimu was deployed as a commander of the underground units in the Transvaal and Northern Transvaal Provinces. He returned to South Africa in 1991 after the unbanning of the ANC. In 1992, he was appointed Deputy Chief of Personnel and Training and served in the MK High Command until the integration of the forces to form the South African National Defence Force in 1994.

After the integration of the forces, he was appointed to General Siphiwe Nyanda’s office as MK Chief of Staff Personnel and Training. Later he was appointed Director, Integration of the Non Statutory Forces (NSF's).

Navy career
Mudimu was integrated into the South African Navy in 1998 from MK as a rear admiral (junior grade). Later, he was appointed as the Inspector General (Navy). That same year, he successfully completed the Navy Senior Command and Staff Course as well as the Senior Management Programme at the University of Stellenbosch.

On 1 April 1999, Mudimu was transferred to Simon's Town where he was appointed Chief of Fleet Staff until 30 September 2000. On 1 October 2000, he was promoted to the rank of rear admiral and appointed as Chief Director Maritime Support, a post later changed to Chief of Naval Staff. He has completed all military courses prescribed for senior officers including the Joint Staff Course 41/99.

In 2005, Mudimu was appointed Chief of the South African Navy and promoted to vice admiral.

Vice Admiral Mudimu retired on 31 March 2014.

Armscor
On 20 March 2014 it was announced that Vice Admiral Mudimu was due to become the next Chairman of Armscor. He resigned from Armscor in 2018 due to ill health.

Awards and decorations

On 19 April 2012, Johannes Mudimu received an Honorary Doctorate from Durban University of Technology.

His list of Military awards includes: 
  
 
 
 
 
 
 
 
 
 
 
 
  Grand Officer Order of Naval Merit (Brazil)
  
 
  Officier Légion d'honneur (France)

See also

 List of South African military chiefs
 South African Navy

References

South African admirals
1954 births
Living people
Recipients of the Order of Naval Merit (Brazil)
Recipients of the Legion of Honour
Commanders of the Legion of Merit
Chiefs of the South African Navy
UMkhonto we Sizwe personnel